Chalavara  is a village and gram panchayat in Palakkad district, Kerala, India.

It is the location of the K. T. N. College of Pharmacy.

Demographics
 India census, Chalavara had a population of 21,042 with 9,952 males and 11,090 females.

References

Villages in Palakkad district
Gram panchayats in Palakkad district